Achille Polonara (born November 23, 1991) is an Italian professional basketball player for Žalgiris Kaunas of the Lithuanian Basketball League (LKL) and the EuroLeague. He primarily plays at the power forward position.

Professional career

Teramo Basket (2009–2012)
After progressing through the youth ranks of Banca Tercas Teramo, Polonara debuted in the first division, the Serie A, in the first game of 2009-10 though he rarely featured that season and played sparingly the next.

He played more regularly during the 2011-12 season with 8.2 points and 4.5 rebounds in 15.6 minutes on average, some coming from a stellar performance against Fabi Shoes Montegranaro in April with 34 points (13/14 from the field) and 9 rebounds for a valuation of  46.
This helped the youngster win the Best Player Under 22 award for the season.
He was also selected (as a replacement) for the Serie A All Star Game.

Cimberio Varese (2012–2014)
Teramo was struggling financially and filed for bankruptcy during the summer of 2012, forcing Polonara to find a new club, which he did in July, signing a 3-year contract containing various escape clauses with Cimberio Varese.
Both parties profited from the deal as Polonara contributed 9.5 points, 5.4 rebounds and 1.6 steals in 23 minutes per game to help the side finish first in the 2012-13 regular season.
He posted 5.8 points, 3.4 rebounds and 0.8 steals in 15 minutes per game in the playoffs as Varese took eventual champions Montepaschi Siena to a seventh game in the semifinals. Polonara was named as the Best Player Under 22 for the second successive season.

The next season saw major players such as Bryant Dunston leave the side, which meant Polonara accrued more playing time.
However, Varese had an anonymous season, losing to Oldenburg in the Euroleague qualifying rounds despite Polonara's team high 18 points to exit Europe's premier competition.
Demoted to the European second tier EuroCup, Varese finished last in group C to also exit the competition, with Polonara posting 7.2 points and 3.6 rebounds per game.
The team also finished out of playoff contention in the league, though he had figures of 10.5 points and 4.8 rebounds per game. The Anconan received a third successive call up to the All Star Game, played in his hometown, winning the Slam Dunk contest.

Varese lost its main sponsor during the off-season, meaning that Polonara's reported €180,000 final contract year was too costly, he wasn't prepared to take a pay cut and wanted to play in a European competition to keep progressing so left the side.

Pallacanestro Reggiana (2014–2017)
Polonara joined Grissin Bon Reggio Emilia in July 2014, signing a three-year contract (with a mutual escape clause after the second year) with the EuroCup playing side. He cited Reggio's practice of playing young Italians as a factor in the decision.

Though Reggio were eliminated in the Eurocup group stage, Polonara started all games, ending as the team's second best scorer (11ppg) and best rebounder (6.4rpg) for a team second 14.3 valuation.
He even picked up a (shared) Round 7 MVP award after a determinant contribution to the November 2014 win over Paris-Levallois.

Polonara had his breakout year in the Serie A, playing more minutes (31.1) than any other teammate, he also finished as second best scorer and best rebounder to earn the highest valuation of the team. His figures of 8.4 rebounds and 18.1 in valuation per game also ranked him 5th in the league for each, with Gazzetta choosing him as their second most improved player for 2014–15.

Dinamo Basket Sassari (2017–2019)
In 2017, he signed for Dinamo Basket Sassari, where he will play for two more seasons in the Italian Basketball League. Dinamo Basket Sassari finished second in the 2018-2019 Italian Basketball League, losing to Reyer Venezia in the finals. An important part of Sassari, who won the FIBA Europe Cup that season, Polonara supported his team with an average of 12.5 points, 6 rebounds, and 2 assists in FIBA Europe Cup.

Baskonia (2019–2021)
On August 28, 2019, Polonara signed a two-year deal with Spanish EuroLeague club Kirolbet Baskonia. He won the Spanish league with Baskonia in the 2019–2020 season. On July 3, 2020, Polonara renewed his contract with the Basques.

Fenerbahçe (2021–2022)
On June 29, 2021, Polonara signed with Fenerbahçe of the Turkish Basketball Super League (BSL) and the EuroLeague. During the 2021-2022 BSL campaign, he averaged 10 points, 5.7 rebounds and 2 assists per game, helping the team to win the domestic championship. Additionally, he posted 7.3 points, 4.3 rebounds and 1.1 assists in 30 EuroLeague appearances. On July 20, 2022, Polonara parted ways with the Turkish powerhouse.

Anadolu Efes (2022–2023)
On July 20, 2022, Polonara signed with Anadolu Efes of the Turkish Basketball Super League (BSL) and the EuroLeague. On January 7, 2023, Polonara parted ways with the Turkish powerhouse.

Žalgiris (2023–present)
On January 7, 2023, Polonara signed with Žalgiris Kaunas of the Lithuanian Basketball League (LKL) and the EuroLeague for the rest of the season.

National team career
Polonara started playing for the youth squads of the Italian national team, first with the Under-18's at the 2009 European Championship. He notably won the silver medal with the U20's at the 2011 European Championship where he was an important contributor, including being the best performer in the semifinal against France.

Polonara was called up to the preliminary squad of the senior team as a temporary replacement for the injured Nicolò Melli as they prepared for EuroBasket 2013. However he himself later picked an ankle injury and was dropped from the squad. 
He would rejoin the senior side in 2014, scoring 20 points on his genuine (discounting the All Star Game) debut against German, he then became a regular in Italy squads.

Participating in the successful EuroBasket 2015 qualification, he played in all 4 games with an average of 3.8 points and 1.3 rebounds in 8.5 minutes.
He was called up to the squad that would take part in EuroBasket 2015 to start on 5 September.

International statistics

Player profile
A left handed stretch four, his athleticism is his primary strength. He's an explosive and energetic player, who's quick and has a great vertical leap, the latter of which has seen him colloquially nicknamed “PolonAir”.

Rebounding is his statistical strength on both ends of the court, using his instincts and speed to surprise opponents.

In attack he's tough to defend as he can operate on the perimeter, where he's able to beat bigger and slower defenders with a fast first-step or punish loose marking with his jump shot. His great wingspan makes him even more potent, whilst he's also effective and smooth on the floor where he can cover ground quickly.
On the defensive side, besides rebounding, he's a great shot blocker thanks to his good timing and balance and also a good pick and roll defender who can switch with the guards thanks to his lateral speed and wingspan.

A mayor negative is his lanky frame, it can see him struggle defending against inside players or muscular guards, in offense it also limits his post move when he's back to the basket, making him an imperfect fit for the 4 position.
For the 3 position, he lacks safe ball-handling on the dribble and needs to develop his shooting options to be a better fit and develop from his Tweener status.

However, he has regularly been noted for his work ethic and determination, helping him improve year on year to add a solid three pointer and the ability to score in traffic to his offensive repertoire, for future development he identifies defensive concentration, 1vs.1 play, especially with the right hand, and better three point shooting as priorities.

Personal
Achille credits his older brother Valerio, who has had a career in the Italian lower leagues, as inspiring him to become a basketball player, the brothers (separated in age by 7 years) are very close.

His nephew, Michele Serpilli, also plays basketball, with the Pesaro youth teams, he reportedly is an admirer of Polonara.

He cites Amedeo Della Valle, Riccardo Cervi, Giovanni Pini and Adam Pechacek as his closest teammates at Reggio Emilia.

Career statistics

EuroLeague

|-
| style="text-align:left;"| 2019–20
| style="text-align:left;" rowspan=2| Baskonia
| 27 || 0 || 12.5 || .326 || .225 || .643 || 2.8 || .2 || .6 || .4 || 3.1 || 4.2
|-
| style="text-align:left;"| 2020–21
| 33 || 29 || 29.7 || .512 || .443 || .603 || 6.6 || 1.9 || 1.2 || .9 || 12.2 || 16.5
|-
| style="text-align:left;"| 2021–22
| style="text-align:left;"| Fenerbahçe
| 30 || 4 || 22.3 || .436 || .302 || .600 || 4.3 || 1.1 || .7 || .5 || 7.3 || 9.0
|-
| style="text-align:left;"| 2022–23
| style="text-align:left;"| Anadolu Efes
| 15 || 8 || 11.4 || .533 || .429 || .571 || 2.2 || .3 || .1 || .5 || 2.8 || 4.4
|- class="sortbottom"
| style="text-align:center;" colspan=2| Career
| 105 || 41 || 20.6 || .465 || .358 || .608 || 4.3 || 1.0 || .7 || .6 || 7.1 || 9.5

EuroCup

|-
| style="text-align:left;"| 2013–14
| style="text-align:left;"| Varese
| 10 || 10 || 25.3 || .278 || .318 || .625 || 3.6 || 1.1 || 1.0 || .5 || 7.2 || 6.0
|-
| style="text-align:left;"| 2014–15
| style="text-align:left;"| Reggio Emilia
| 10 || 10 || 30.9 || .406 || .289 || .767 || 6.4 || 1.3 || 1.1 || .6 || 11.0 || 14.3
|-
| style="text-align:left;"| 2015–16
| style="text-align:left;"| Reggio Emilia
| 16 || 15 || 26.0 || .482 || .361 || .615 || 6.9 || 1.4 || .6 || .6 || 11.1 || 14.6
|- class="sortbottom"
| style="text-align:center;" colspan=2| Career
| 36 || 35 || 27.2 || .413 || .327 || .671 || 5.9 || 1.3 || .9 || .6 || 10.0 || 12.1

Domestic leagues

|-
| style="text-align:left;"| 2009–10
| style="text-align:left;"| Teramo
| 5 || 0 || 5.0 || 2.0 || .750 || .500 || 1.000 || .4 || .0 || .2 || .4 || .2 
|-
| style="text-align:left;"| 2010–11
| style="text-align:left;"| Teramo
| 26 || 1 || 11.6 || 3.0 || .386 || .100 || .718 || 3.2 || .4 || .9 || .6 || .7 
|-
| style="text-align:left;"| 2011–12
| style="text-align:left;"| Teramo
| 32 || 0 || 15.6 || 8.2 || .708 || .341 || .633 || 4.5 || .7 || .7 || .7 || 1.2 
|-
| style="text-align:left;"| 2012–13
| style="text-align:left;"| Varese
| 28 || 7 || 22.9 || 9.5 || .543 || .342 || .636 || 5.4 || 1.0 || .6 || 1.6 || 1.4
|-
| style="text-align:left;"| 2013–14
| style="text-align:left;"| Varese
| 30 || 30 || 26.6 || 10.5 || .593 || .336 || .746 || 4.8 || 1.1 || .4 || .7 || 1.0
|-
| style="text-align:left;"| 2014–15
| style="text-align:left;"| Reggio Emilia
| 30 || 27 || 31.1 || 12.0 || .578 || .375 || .627 || 8.4 || 1.4 || .8 || .9 || 1.0
|-
| style="text-align:left;"| 2015–16
| style="text-align:left;"| Reggio Emilia
| 30 || 29 || 26.9 || 10.4 || .600 || .349 || .592 || 7.1 || 1.4 || .5 || .8 || 1.1
|-
| style="text-align:left;"| 2016–17
| style="text-align:left;"| Reggio Emilia
| 30 || 20 || 28.1 || 10.5 || .605 || .379 || .565 || 6.8 || 1.7 || .6 || .9 || .9
|-
| style="text-align:left;"| 2017–18
| style="text-align:left;"| Sassari
| 30 || 28 || 27.2 || 10.9 || .581 || .405 || .596 || 5.6 || 1.6 || .7 || .7 || .9
|-
| style="text-align:left;"| 2018–19
| style="text-align:left;"| Sassari
| 29 || 1 || 21.2 || 9.9 || .614 || .361 || .763 || 5.5 || 1.2 || .6 || .6 || .8
|-
| style="text-align:left; background:#afe6ba;"| 2019–20†
| style="text-align:left;"| Baskonia
| 23 || 0 || 11.0 || 4.4 || .619 || .344 || .762 || 2.3 || .3 || .2 || .4 || .3

|-
| style="text-align:left;"| 2013
| style="text-align:left;"| Varese
| 12 || 1 || 14.8 || 5.8 || .500 || .333 || .778 || 3.4 || .7 || .0 || .8 || .8
|-
| style="text-align:left;"| 2015
| style="text-align:left;"| Reggio Emilia
| 19 || 19 || 33.4 || 12.2 || .526 || .348 || .644 || 8.1 || 1.6 || .9 || 1.2 || 1.2
|-
| style="text-align:left;"| 2016
| style="text-align:left;"| Reggio Emilia
| 16 || 11 || 30.1 || 9.9 || .662 || .237 || .700 || 7.6 || 1.7 || .9 || 1.3 || 1.3
|-
| style="text-align:left;"| 2017
| style="text-align:left;"| Reggio Emilia
| 3 || 2 || 23.0 || 7.3 || .800 || .308 || .400 || 4.3 || .3 || .3 || .3 || 1.3
|-
| style="text-align:left;"| 2019
| style="text-align:left;"| Sassari
| 13 || 0 || 21.5 || 8.7 || .604 || .351 || .640 || 5.5 || 1.2 || .4 || .8 || .8
|-
| style="text-align:left; background:#afe6ba;"| 2020†
| style="text-align:left;"| Baskonia
| 7 || 1 || 18.4 || 8.3 || .652 || .500 || .700 || 4.7 || .9 || .6 || .9 || .9

Honours

Individual
Serie A
Best Player Under 22: 2012, 2013
Lega Basket All Star Game
Participant: 2012–2015
Slam dunk contest winner: 2014
 Premio Reverberi: 2015 (best player)

Team

International
European Under-20 Championship
2011 Bilbao

References

External links
 EuroLeague profile
 Pallacanestro Reggiana profile
 Lega Basket Serie A profile 
 FIBA profile
 Real GM profile
 TBLStat.net Profile

1991 births
Living people
Basketball players at the 2020 Summer Olympics
BC Žalgiris players
Dinamo Sassari players
Fenerbahçe men's basketball players
Italian expatriate basketball people in Spain
Italian expatriate basketball people in Turkey
Italian expatriate sportspeople in Lithuania
Italian men's basketball players
Lega Basket Serie A players
Liga ACB players
Olympic basketball players of Italy
Pallacanestro Reggiana players
Pallacanestro Varese players
Power forwards (basketball)
Saski Baskonia players
Small forwards
Sportspeople from Ancona
Teramo Basket players